Mark A. "Droopy" Clark is a retired U.S. Marine Major General. Clark was the fourth commander of Marine Corps Forces Special Operations Command (MARSOC). He retired from the Marine Corps in 2014 upon relinquishing command of MARSOC.

Early life
Clark is a native of Sioux Falls and was raised in South Dakota and Minnesota. He graduated from South Dakota State University with a Bachelor of Science Degree in Commercial Economics in 1980. According to a Q&A interview with the SDSU alumni association while Clark was serving as the Chief of Staff of Special Operations Command he said his most memorable moment while attending SDSU was "without a doubt, Hobo Day."

Military career
Upon completion of Officer Candidate School in June 1981, Clark was commissioned as a Second Lieutenant in the United States Marine Corps. Afterwards, he attended Flight School and was designated a Naval Aviator in May 1983. He was assigned to fly the CH-53 Super Stallion after additional training at Marine Corps Air Station New River, North Carolina. He participated in both Operation Desert Storm and Operation Desert Shield. His first involvement with Special Operations came as a result of a pilot exchange program with the U.S. Air Force where Clark was assigned to the 20th Special Operations Squadron operating the MH-53J Pave Low. While at the 20th SOS, Clark was deployed in support of Operation Deliberate Force during the Bosnian War. From 2001 to 2002, Clark served as Operations Officer in Task Force K-Bar during the early years of Operation Enduring Freedom. Clark attended the United States Army War College from 2002 to 2003. While a student there, he wrote a 67-page Strategy Research Project titled Should the Marine Corps expand its role in special operations. He was the Director of Operations at United States Special Operations Command from 2009 to 2011. While serving as the Director of Operations in January 2011, Secretary of Defense Robert Gates announced that Clark was nominated for promotion to Major General. In May 2011, he replaced Joseph Votel as SOCOM's Chief of Staff as Votel went off to assume command of Joint Special Operations Command from Admiral William H. McRaven. Clark served as SOCOM's Chief of Staff until August 2012 when he assumed command of Marine Corps Forces Special Operations Command from Major General Paul E. Lefebvre He is the first MARSOC commander to have served previously at SOCOM.

Awards and badges

Naval Aviator insignia

 Defense Superior Service Medal
 Legion of Merit 
 Bronze Star
 Meritorious Service Medal with one gold star
 Aerial Achievement Medal
 Navy and Marine Corps Commendation Medalwith two gold star
 Joint Service Achievement Medal
 Navy and Marine Corps Achievement Medal
 Combat Action Ribbon with one gold star
 Navy Presidential Unit Citation
 Joint Meritorious Unit Award
 Navy Unit Commendation
 Navy Meritorious Unit Commendationwith one bronze star 
 Air Force Outstanding Unit Award
 Marine Corps Expeditionary Medal
 National Defense Service Medal with one bronze star
 Armed Forces Expeditionary Medal
 Southwest Asia Service Medal with three bronze star
 Afghanistan Campaign Medal 
 Global War on Terrorism Expeditionary Medal
 Global War on Terrorism Service Medal
 Armed Forces Service Medal
 Humanitarian Service Medal with one bronze star
 Navy Sea Service Deployment Ribbon with one bronze star
 NATO Medal
 Kuwait Liberation Medal (Saudi Arabia)
 Kuwait Liberation Medal (Kuwait)

 Office of the Joint Chiefs of Staff Identification Badge
 United States Special Operations Command Badge

References

United States Marine Corps generals
Living people
Recipients of the Legion of Merit
Year of birth missing (living people)